Robin Hood Newly Revived is Child ballad 128, and an origin story for Will Scarlet.

Synopsis
Robin Hood and Little John are hunting when they see a finely dressed stranger shoot a deer. Robin says if he accepts it, he can be a yeoman in their band. The stranger threatens him, and forbids him to sound his horn. They aim arrows at each other, and Robin proposes that they fight with swords instead. They strike some blows. Robin asks him who he is, and he is Young Gamwell, and, because he killed his father's steward, he is seeking his uncle, who is called Robin Hood. That stops their fight, and they join the band. Little John asks why he is gone so long, and Robin says they were fighting, but Little John must not fight him. He names his nephew Scarlet.

See also
Another variation of this story was collected as Child ballad 132, The Bold Pedlar and Robin Hood.

External links
Robin Hood and the Newly Revived

Child Ballads
Robin Hood ballads